Public welfare in Puerto Rico is a system of nutrition assistance, public health, education, and subsidized public housing, among others, provided to the impoverished population of the island.

Federal programs

The following programs are provided by the U.S. Federal government in Puerto Rico:

 Head Start Program
 USDA Nutrition Assistance for Puerto Rico (Programa de Asistencia Nutricional)
 Section 8 (housing)
 USDA Section 515 Rural Rental Housing
 Community Development Block Grant
 Temporary Assistance for Needy Families
USDA Rural Development programs

See also 

 Economy of Puerto Rico
 Welfare in New York
 Welfare in California

External links
 Puerto Rico Government homepage 
 Benefits.gov Benefits Report on Nutrition Assistance for Puerto Rico.
Social Security Administration webpage with information on SSI
The Social Security Act
Title XVI in particular
www.whitehouse.gov